KTCC (91.9 FM, "T-92") is a radio station licensed to serve Colby, Kansas, United States. The station, which began broadcasting in May 1974, is owned and operated by Colby Community College.

KTCC broadcasts a modern rock-leaning college radio music format.

References

External links
KTCC official website

TCC
Modern rock radio stations in the United States
Thomas County, Kansas
Radio stations established in 1974
TCC